This is a list of people who have received a state funeral.

Africa

Algeria
 Ahmed Ben Bella
 Abdelaziz Bouteflika

Angola
 Agostino Neto
 Jose Eduardo dos Santos

Botswana
 Sir Seretse Khama
 Ruth Williams Khama
 Gladys Olebile Masire
 Sir Ketumile Masire

Burundi
 Pierre Nkurunziza

Cameroon
 Marc-Vivien Foe

DR Congo
 Laurent-Desire Kabila

Egypt
 Gamal Abdel Nasser (October 1, 1970)
 Mohammad Reza Pahlavi (July 29, 1980), Shah of Iran who died in exile in Egypt
 Anwar Sadat (October 8, 1981)
 Hosni Mubarak (February 26, 2020)

Ethiopia
 Meles Zenawi
 Sylvia Pankhurst
 Tilahun Gessesse

Gabon
 Edith Lucie Bongo
 Omar Bongo

Ghana

Ivory Coast

Kenya
 Mzee Jomo Kenyatta
 Lucy Kibaki
 Wangari Maathai
 Wahome Gakuru
 Joyce Laboso
 Daniel arap Moi
 Mwai Kibaki

Malawi
 Bingu wa Mutharika

Mozambique
 Samora Machel
 Afonso Dhlakama

Namibia
 Andimba Toivo ya Toivo

Somalia
 Hassan Abshir Farah
 Nur Hassan Hussein

South Africa

South Sudan
 Gordon Muortat Mayen
 Dr. John Garang de Mabior

Tanzania
 Benjamin Mkapa
 John Magufuli
 Julius Nyerere

Tunisia
 Beji Caid Essebsi

Uganda
 Godfrey Binaisa
 Mutesa II of Buganda
 Milton Obote
 Jacob Oulanyah

Zambia
 Levy Mwanawasa
 Frederick Chiluba
 Betty Kaunda
 Michael Sata
 Kenneth Kaunda

Zimbabwe
 Joshua Nkomo
 Simon Muzenda
 Joseph Msika
 John Nkomo
 Oliver Mtukudzi
 Robert Mugabe

Americas

Argentina
 

 In 1952 Eva Perón died at age 33
 Raul Alfonsín
 Argentina's former President and Secretary General of UNASUR, Néstor Kirchner, died of heart failure on the morning of October 27, 2010, at the age of 60.

Barbados

 Former Barbados Prime Minister David Thompson.

Brazil

 State funerals were held for the President-elect of Brazil, Tancredo Neves, who died before taking office.
 The former Vice President of Brazil, José Alencar, was also buried with a head of state's honor, after his passing due to cancer.
 Other than heads of state, personalities such as the Formula 1 racing champion Ayrton Senna, dead in 1994 after a crash during a race,
 The architect Oscar Niemeyer, who died in 2012 at the age of 104
 The legendary footballer Pelé, who died in 2022 at the age of 82

Canada

 In August 2011, in a rare circumstance, Prime Minister Stephen Harper offered a state funeral for his political adversary and Leader of the Opposition, Jack Layton. Layton died of cancer three months after his New Democratic Party became the official opposition, for the first time in his party's history.
 In 2014, former finance minister Jim Flaherty received a state funeral after his death.

Dominica

 Crispin Sorhaindo, former President of Dominica, was given a state funeral on January 18, 2010, in Roseau.

Ecuador

 On November 16, 2016, the state funeral of former President of Ecuador Sixto Durán Ballén was held in Quito.

Grenada

 On March 16, 2012, a state funeral was held in St. George's for former Grenadian Prime Minister George Ignatius Brizan.

Jamaica

 Legendary reggae singer Bob Marley received a state funeral in Jamaica on May 21, 1981, which combined elements of Ethiopian Orthodoxy and Rastafari tradition.

 On July 18, 2004, a state funeral was held for former Jamaican Prime Minister Hugh Shearer in Kingston.

 On June 23, 2019, a state funeral was held for former Jamaican Prime Minister Edward Philip George Seaga in Kingston.

Mexico

 Novelist Carlos Fuentes received a state funeral on May 16, 2012, with his funeral cortege briefly stopping traffic in Mexico City.

 State funerals have also been held for former Mexican presidents.
 The most recent Presidential funeral was that of Miguel de la Madrid.

St Lucia

 Sir William George Mallet GCSL GCMG CBE (July 24, 1923 – October 20, 2010) received a state funeral on October 28, 2010, in the capital Castries. Mallet was a politician who held a number of high offices in Saint Lucia, one of the Windward Islands of the Lesser Antilles in the Eastern Caribbean. On June 1, 1996, "Sir George" was appointed to the office of Governor-General of St Lucia.

The Bahamas

 On September 4, 2000, a state funeral was held in Nassau for former Bahamian Prime Minister Sir Lynden Pindling.
 On January 5, 2012, a state funeral was held in Nassau for former Bahamian Governor-General Sir Clifford Darling.

United States

In the United States, state funerals are held in the nation's capital, Washington, D.C., and involve military spectacle, ceremonial pomp, and religious observance. As the highest possible honor bestowed upon a person posthumously, state funerals are an entitlement offered to a sitting or former President of the United States, a President-elect, as well as other people designated by the President. Administered by the Military District of Washington (MDW), state funerals are greatly influenced by protocol, steeped in tradition, and rich in history. However, the overall planning as well as the decision to hold a state funeral, is largely determined by the President before his death and the First Family.

State funerals have been held in Washington D.C. for:
 William Henry Harrison (1841),
 Zachary Taylor (1850),
 Abraham Lincoln (1865), Thaddeus Stevens (1868),
 James A. Garfield (1881),
 William McKinley (1901),
 Warren G. Harding (1923),
 the Unknown Soldier of World War I (1921),
 William Howard Taft (1930),
 John J. Pershing (1948),
 the Unknown Soldiers of World War II and the Korean War (1958),
 John F. Kennedy (1963),
 Douglas MacArthur (1964),
 Herbert Hoover (1964),
 Dwight D. Eisenhower (1969),
 Lyndon B. Johnson (1973),
 Ronald Reagan (2004),
 Gerald Ford (2006–2007),
 George H. W. Bush (2018),
 Ruth Bader Ginsburg (2020).

Asia and Oceania

Australia
 In rare occasions a Commonwealth state funeral is offered to people outside politics but who made a significant contribution to the nation, for example Sir Douglas Mawson was granted a Commonwealth state funeral in 1958.

 Military state funerals are offered to former senior officers of the Australian Defence Force, for example Field Marshall Sir Thomas Blamey

 The Unknown Soldier was given a Commonwealth military state funeral on November 11, 1993, before being interred in the Hall of Memory at the Australian War Memorial.

New South Wales
 Some former governors who had previous military service were given military state funerals, for example Rear Admiral Sir David Martin and Air Marshal Sir James Rowland.

 On November 27, 2007, Bernie Banton, a campaigner for asbestos victims who worked for James Hardie, lost his battle with mesothelioma, an asbestos-related disease. His family was offered a state funeral by NSW premier Morris Iemma.

Queensland

Victoria

 Explorers Robert O'Hara Burke and William John Wills received Victoria's first (and Australia's second) state funeral on January 21, 1863.

 Broadcaster Peter Evans (1985),
 Australian rules football player Ted Whitten (1995),
 race-car driver Peter Brock (2006),
 actor Charles 'Bud' Tingwell (2009), Australian Rules football player and charity worker Jim Stynes (2012),
 Australian Rules football player and media personality Lou Richards (2017),
 and cricketer Shane Warne (2022).

 A state funeral was also offered to the family of the Seekers' singer Judith Durham (2022), which was accepted.

 Olivia Newton-John was offered a state funeral following her death on August 8, 2022. Her family have accepted the offer.

South Australia
State funerals are generally offered to former Governors, Premiers, Deputy Premiers, Speakers of the House of Assembly, Chief Justices and other senior public officials.

 Surveyor General Lieutenant Colonel William Light (1786–1839) received South Australia's, and Australia's, first state funeral on October 10, 1839.

Western Australia
The offer of a state funeral is a decision of the Cabinet.

Tasmania
State funerals are generally offered to former Governors, Premiers, Deputy Premiers, Speakers of the House of Assembly, Chief Justices and other senior public officials.

Australian Capital Territory
The offer of a state funeral is at the discretion of the Chief Minister. People who have received state funerals include:

 former chief minister Trevor Kaine
 Supreme Court judge Terry Connolly 
 former chairman of the Canberra Commercial Development Authority Jim Pead

Azerbaijan

 A state funeral was held for President Heydar Aliyev in 2003.
 Former president Abulfaz Elchibey was also accorded a state funeral upon his death.

Cambodia
Cambodia held state funerals for the following people:
 King Norodom Suramarit (1960)
 King Norodom Sihanouk (2012)

Republic of China 
By the Parliament of the Republic of China
 Cai E (1917)
 Huang Xing (April 15, 1917)
 Sun Yat-sen (June 1, 1929)
By the Canton Military Government
 Cheng Biguang (March 2, 1918)
 Li Zhonglin (1920)
 Lin Xiumei (1921)
 Wu Tingfang (December 3, 1924)
 Liao Zhongkai (August 1925, 1935)
By the Nanking Nationalist Government
 Tan Yankai (1930)
 Lu Shidi (1930)
 Li Yuanhong (1935)
 Duan Qirui (November 2, 1936)
 Hu Hanmin (June 17, 1936)
 Shao Yuanchong (March 9, 1937)
 Zhu Peide (March 13, 1937)
 Tang Jiyao (December 25, 1937)
 Liu Xiang (February 14, 1938)
 Xie Chi (May 6, 1939)
 Lin Sen (August 1943)
 Cai Yuanpei (May 10, 1947)
 Zhang Zizhong (May 28, 1940)
 Tong Linge (July 28, 1946)
 Bo Wenwei, Chen Qimei, Zhang Ji, Hao Mengling, Li Jiayu, Qin Zhen (May 19, 1948)
 Dai Jitao (April 1949)
By the Government of Republic of China (Taiwan)
 Hu Shih (1962)
 Chen Cheng (1965)
 Chiang Kai-shek (1975)
 Chiang Ching-kuo (1988)
 Yen Chia-kan (January 22, 1994)
 Teresa Teng (May 28, 1995)
 8 soldiers who died in the UH-1 tragedy (April 11, 2007)
 8 soldiers who died in 2020 ROCAF UH-60M crash, including Shen Yi-ming (January 14, 2020)
 Lee Teng-hui (October 7, 2020)

Hong Kong

British Hong Kong

 Edward Youde was given Hong Kong's first state funeral in 1986.

Hong Kong post-1997
 Mr. Ann Tse-kai (2000)—Hong Kong – former Legislative Council, Executive Council of Hong Kong, Chinese People's Political Consultative Conference, Basic Law Committee, Hong Kong Affairs Advisor
 Wong Ker-lee (2004) – Hong Kong business man, founder of Winco Paper Products
 Henry Fok Ying-tung (2006)—Beijing and Hong Kong; Hong Kong businessman

India

Presidents of India (died in office)
 Dr. Zakir Hussain (1969)
 Fakhruddin Ali Ahmed (1977)

Vice presidents of India (died in office)
 Krishan Kant (2002)

Prime Ministers of India (died in office)
 Jawaharlal Nehru (1964)
 Lal Bahadur Shastri (1966)
 Indira Gandhi (1984)

Former presidents of India
 Rajendra Prasad (1963)
 A.P.J. Abdul Kalam (2015)
 Pranab Mukherjee (2020)

Former Prime Ministers of India
 Charan Singh (1987)
 Rajiv Gandhi (1991)
 Morarji Desai (1995)
 Gulzarilal Nanda (1998)
 P. V. Narasimha Rao (2004)
 Chandra Shekhar Singh (2007)
 Vishwanath Pratap Singh (2008)
 Inder Kumar Gujral (2012)
 Atal Bihari Vajpayee (2018)

Cabinet Ministers of India (died in office)
 Ananth Kumar (2018)

Former Cabinet Ministers of India
 Arun Jaitley (2019)

Chief Ministers of India (died in office)
 Gopinath Bordoloi, Chief Minister of Assam (1950)
 Ravishankar Shukla, Chief Minister of Madhya Pradesh (1956)
 Sri Krishna Singh, Chief Minister of Bihar (1961)
 Bidhan Chandra Roy, Chief Minister of West Bengal (1962)
 Marotrao Kannamwar, Chief Minister of Maharastra (1963)
 Balwantrai Mehta, Chief Minister of Gujarat (1965)
 C. N. Annadurai, Chief Minister of Tamil Nadu (1969)
 Dayanand Bandodkar, Chief Minister of Goa (1973)
 Barkatullah Khan, Chief Minister of Rajasthan (1973)
 Sheikh Abdullah, Chief Minister of Jammu and Kashmir (1982)
 M. G. Ramachandran, Chief Minister of Tamil Nadu (1987)
 Chimanbhai Patel, Chief Minister of Gujarat (1994)
 Beant Singh, Chief Minister of Punjab (1995)
 Y. S. Rajasekhara Reddy, Chief Minister of Erstwhile Andhra Pradesh (2009)
 Dorjee Khandu, Chief Minister of Arunachal Pradesh (2011)
 Mufti Mohammad Sayeed, Chief Minister of Jammu and Kashmir (state) (2016)
 J. Jayalalithaa, Chief Minister of Tamil Nadu (2016)
 Manohar Parrikar, Chief Minister of Goa (2019)

Former Chief Ministers of India
 P. S. Kumaraswamy Raja, Former Chief Minister of Tamil Nadu (1957)
 Tanguturi Prakasam, Former Chief Minister of Tamil Nadu (1957)
 O. P. Ramaswamy Reddiyar, Former Chief Minister of Tamil Nadu (1970)
 C. Rajagopalachari, Former Chief Minister of Tamil Nadu and last Governor-General of India from 1948 to 1950 (1972)
 K. Kamaraj, Former Chief Minister of Tamil Nadu (1975)
 M. Bhaktavatsalam, Former Chief Minister of Tamil Nadu (1987)
 N. T. Rama Rao, Former Chief Minister of Andhra Pradesh (1996)
 E. K. Mawlong, Former Chief Minister of Meghalaya (2008)
 Jyoti Basu, Former Chief Minister of West Bengal (2010)
 M. Karunanidhi, Former Chief Minister of Tamil Nadu (2018)
 N. D. Tiwari, Former Chief Minister of Uttarakhand (2018)
 Madan Lal Khurana, Former Chief Minister of Delhi (2018)
 Sheila Dikshit, Former Chief Minister of Delhi (2019)
 Sushma Swaraj, Former Chief Minister of Delhi (2019)
 Jagannath Mishra, Former Chief Minister of Bihar (2019)
 Babulal Gaur, Former Chief Minister of Madhya Pradesh (2019)
 Tarun Gogoi, Former Chief Minister of Assam (2020)
 Kalyan Singh, Former Chief Minister of Uttar Pradesh (2021)
 Mulayam Singh Yadav, Former Chief Minister of Uttar Pradesh (2022)

Former Chief Justices of India
 Y.V. Chandrachud (2008)

Holders of the Bharat Ratna
 Mother Teresa (1997)
 Bhimsen Joshi (2011)
 Lata Mangeshkar (2022)

Former Ministers of State
 Gurudas Kamat (2018)

Chief of Defence Staff (died in office)
General Bipin Rawat (2021)

Former Chiefs of Staff of the Indian Armed Forces
 Field Marshal Sam Manekshaw (2008)
 Marshal of the Air Force Arjan Singh (2017)

Former cabinet ministers in states
 Nandamuri Harikrishna (2018)
 K. M. Mani (2019)

Other personalities who received a state funeral:
 Mahatma Gandhi (1948)
 Sivaji Ganesan (2001)
 Dr Raj Kumar (2006)
 Gangubai Hangal (2009)
 Sathya Sai Baba (2011)
 Bal Thackeray (2012)
 Sarabjeet Singh (2013)
 Syedna Mohammed Burhanuddin (2014)
 Javare Gowda (2016)
 Kishori Amonkar (2017)
 Shashi Kapoor (2017)
 Sridevi (2018)
 Dada J. P. Vaswani (2018)
 Ajit Wadekar (2018)
 Shivakumara Swami (2019)
 Vishwesha Teertha (2019)
 Pandit Jasraj (2020)
Bannanje Govindacharya (2020)
Roddam Narasimha (2020)
Vivek (2021)
Milkha Singh (2021)
Dilip Kumar (2021)
Puneeth Rajkumar (2021)
Rahul Bajaj (2022)
Shivkumar Sharma (2022)

Indonesia

State funerals has been arranged on the respective dates:
 Sudirman (January 30, 1950)
 The seven victims of the 30 September Movement (October 5, 1965)
 Sukarno (June 22, 1970)
 Mohammad Hatta (March 15, 1980)
 Hamengkubuwono IX (October 8, 1988)
 Tien Suharto (April 29, 1996)
 Suharto (January 28, 2008)
 Abdurrahman Wahid (December 31, 2009)
 Ani Yudhoyono (June 1, 2019)
 B. J. Habibie (September 12, 2019)

Iran
 Reza Shah (May 1950)
 Ali Razmara (March 9, 1951)
 Hassan-Ali Mansur (January 27, 1965)
 Mohammad Ali Rajai and Mohammad Javad Bahonar (August 30, 1981)
 Ruhollah Khomeini (June 5, 1989)
 Mohammad-Reza Mahdavi Kani (October 23, 2014)
 Akbar Hashemi Rafsanjani (January 10, 2017)
 Mahmoud Hashemi Shahroudi (December 26, 2018)

Japan

Formal state funeral
 Okubo Toshimichi (1878)
 Iwakura Tomomi (1883)
 Shimazu Hisamitsu (1887)
 Sanjō Sanetomi (1891)
 Prince Arisugawa Taruhito (1895)
 Prince Kitashirakawa Yoshihisa (1895)
 Mouri Motonori (1896)
 Empress Eishō (1897)
 Shimazu Tadayoshi (2nd) (1898)
 Prince Komatsu Akihito (1903)
 Itō Hirobumi (1909)
 Emperor Meiji (1912)
 Prince Arisugawa Takehito (1913)
 Ōyama Iwao (1916)
 Gojong of Korea (1919)
 Yamagata Aritomo (1922)
 Prince Fushimi Sadanaru (1923)
 Matsukata Masayoshi (1924)
 Sunjong of Korea (1926)
 Emperor Taishō (1926)
 Tōgō Heihachirō (1934)
 Saionji Kinmochi (1940)
 Isoroku Yamamoto (1943)
 Prince Kan'in Kotohito (1945)
 Empress Teimei (1951)
 Shigeru Yoshida (1967)
 Emperor Shōwa (1989)
 Shinzō Abe (2022)

Funeral where the state is involved
 Ōkuma Shigenobu (1922)
 Kijūrō Shidehara (1951)
 Yukio Ozaki (1954)
 Tsuneo Matsudaira (1954)
 Eisaku Satō (1975)
 Masayoshi Ōhira (1980)
 Nobusuke Kishi (1987)
 Takeo Miki (1988)
 Akira Ono (1990)
 Takeo Fukuda (1995)
 Keizō Obuchi (2000)
 Zenkō Suzuki (2004)
 Ryutaro Hashimoto (2006)
 Kiichi Miyazawa (2007)
 Takeo Nishioka (2011)
 Yasuhiro Nakasone (2020)

New Zealand

 John Ballance in 1893 
 Joseph Ward in 1930 
 Michael Joseph Savage in 1940.
 Sir Frederic Truby King (1937) who founded the Plunket Society,
 the unidentified victims of the Tangiwai rail disaster (1953),
 Victoria Cross recipient Jack Hinton (1997),
 the mountaineer Sir Edmund Hillary (2008) 
 the Unknown Warrior whose reinterment (from the Caterpillar Valley Cemetery on the Somme in France) took place on Armistice Day, November 11, 2004, and whose tomb at the New Zealand National War Memorial represents all New Zealand soldiers who died in war.

North Korea
State funerals are infrequent in North Korea. Funerals, and who appears on official funeral committees, are considered important cues on power hierarchies of North Korean politics. According to a tradition inherited from the Soviet Union, the chairperson of the funeral committee of a deceased leader of North Korea is beyond all doubt the next leader. This held true when Kim Il-sung died in 1994 and was succeeded by Kim Jong-il, who in turn was succeeded by Kim Jong-un in 2011.
 
 Jang Kil-bu
 Ho Hon (1951)
 Hong Won-kil (1976)
 Nam Il (1976)
 Choe Yong-gon (army commander) (1976)
 Jang Chol-gu (1982)
 Kim Il (1984), whose funeral committee consisted of 69 people.
 Rim Chun-chu (1988), whose funeral committee consisted of 57 people.
 Choe Tok-sin (1989), whose funeral committee consisted of 23 people.
 So Chol (1992)
 Kang Hui-won (1994)
 Death and state funeral of Kim Il-sung (1994), whose funeral committee consisted of 273 people.
 O Jin-u (1995), whose funeral committee consisted of 240.
 Choe Kwang (1997), whose funeral committee consisted of 85 people.
 Kim Kwang-jin (1997)
 Ri Jong-ok (1999), whose funeral committee consisted of 60 people.
 Kim Pyong-sik (1999), whose funeral committee consisted of 18 people.
 Jon Mun-sop (1999)
 Choi Hong-hui (2002), whose funeral committee consisted of 14 people.
 Ri Tu-ik (2002)
 Yon Hyong-muk (2005), whose funeral committee consisted of 49 people.
 Pak Song-chol (2008), whose funeral committee consisted of 65 people.
 Hong Song-nam (2009), whose funeral committee consisted of 35 people.
 Kim Jung-rin (2010), whose funeral committee consisted of 41 people.
 Jo Myong-rok (2010), whose funeral committee consisted of 171 people.
  (2011), whose funeral committee consisted of 47 people.
 Death and state funeral of Kim Jong-il (2011), whose funeral committee consisted of 232 people.
 Kim Kuk-thae (2013), whose funeral committee consisted of 54 people.
 Jon Pyong-ho (2014), whose funeral committee consisted 89 of people.
 Kim Yang-gon (2015), whose funeral committee consisted of 70 people.
 Ri Ul-sol (2015), whose funeral committee consisted of 169 people.
 Kang Sok-ju (2016), whose funeral committee consisted of 53 people.
 Ryu Mi-yong (2016), whose funeral committee consisted of 11 people.
 Kang Ki-sop (2017)
 Kim Yong-chun (2018), whose funeral committee consisted of 149 people.
 Kim Chol-man (2018), whose funeral committee consisted of 71 people.
 Hwang Sun-hui (2020), whose funeral committee consisted of 69 people.
 Hyon Chol-hae (2022), whose funeral committee consisted of 184 people.

Pakistan
Pakistan held the state funerals for the following people:
 Muhammad Ali Jinnah (1948) – Father of the Nation and the 1st Governor-General of Pakistan (1947–48): died in office
 Muhammad Zia-ul-Haq (1988) – 6th President of Pakistan (1978–88) and 2nd Chief of Army Staff (1976–88): died in office
 Mushaf Ali Mir (2003) – 9th Chief of Air Staff (2000–03): died in office
 Anwar Shamim (2013) – 3rd Chief of Air Staff (1978–85)
 Abdul Sattar Edhi (2016) – Philanthropist and founder of Edhi Foundation
 Ruth Pfau (2017) – Physician who devoted more than 55 years of her life to fighting leprosy in Pakistan
 Asghar Khan (2018) – 5th Commander-in-Chief of the Pakistan Air Force (1957–65)
 Abdul Qadeer Khan (2021) – Nuclear physicist who is colloquially known as the "Father of Pakistan's atomic weapons program"

Philippines
The Philippines held the state funerals for the following people:
 Manuel L. Quezon (1944) – 2nd President of the Philippines (1935–44): died in office
 Manuel Roxas (1948) – 5th President of the Philippines (1946–48): died in office
 Elpidio Quirino (1956) – 6th President of the Philippines (1948–53)
 Ramon Magsaysay (1957) – 7th President of the Philippines (1953–57): died in office
 Jose P. Laurel (1959) – 3th President of the Philippines (1943–45)
 Sergio Osmeña (1961) – 4th President of the Philippines (1944–46)
 Emilio Aguinaldo (1964) – 1st President of the Philippines (1899–1901)
 Carlos P. Garcia (1971) – 8th President of the Philippines (1957–61)
 Benigno Aquino Jr. (1983) – Senator of the Philippines (1967–72)
 Carlos P. Romulo (1985) – Secretary of Foreign Affairs (1968–84)
 Diosdado Macapagal (1997) – 9th President of the Philippines (1961–65)
 Blas Ople (2003) – Secretary of Foreign Affairs (2002–03): died in office
 Jaime Sin (2005) – 30th Archbishop of Manila (1974–2005)
 Corazon Aquino (2009) – 11th President of the Philippines (1986–92)
 Perla Santos-Ocampo (2012) – National Scientist of the Philippines
 Jesse Robredo (2012) – Secretary of Interior and Local Government (2010–12): died in office
 Miriam Defensor Santiago (2016) – Senator of the Philippines (1995–2001; 2004–16)
 Benigno Aquino III (2021) – 15th President of the Philippines (2010–16)
 Ramon Barba (2021) – National Scientist of the Philippines
 F. Sionil José (2022) – National Artist of the Philippines
 Fidel V. Ramos (planned, 2022) – 12th President of the Philippines (1992–98)

Singapore
A state funeral was arranged for the following people on their deathbed on the respective date:
 Ahmad Ibrahim (August 21, 1962) – Minister of Health and Labour
 Yusof Ishak (November 23, 1970) – 1st President of Singapore
 Benjamin Henry Sheares (May 12, 1981) – 2nd President of Singapore
 Wee Kim Wee (May 2, 2005) – 4th President of Singapore
 S. Rajaratnam (February 25, 2006) – former Deputy Prime Minister of Singapore
 Goh Keng Swee (May 23, 2010) – former Deputy Prime Minister of Singapore
 Kwa Geok Choo (October 2, 2010) – spouse of Lee Kuan Yew
 Lee Kuan Yew (March 23, 2015) – 1st Prime Minister of Singapore
 S. R. Nathan (August 22, 2016) – 6th President of Singapore

Another type of funeral in Singapore is a state-assisted funeral. Similar to a state funeral, the deceased may or may not be entitled to a ceremonial gun carriage, though he/she does not lie in state in the Istana. Such funerals are accorded to:
 Ong Teng Cheong (February 11, 2002) – 5th President of Singapore
 Lim Kim San (July 20, 2006) – former Cabinet Minister
 Toh Chin Chye (February 7, 2012) – former Deputy Prime Minister
 Othman Wok (April 17, 2017) – former Cabinet Minister

South Korea
In past Korea, there were national funeral(국민장) and state funeral(국장). However, in 2009, Roh Moo Hyun was held as a national funeral and Kim Dae Jung as a state funeral, sparking controversy over the formality of the funeral, and the revision of the law in 2011 merged the two types of funerals into state funeral(국가장).

State funerals in South Korea are a mix of the Western and Korean funeral traditions, these are modern adaptations of the rites held in the funerals of Emperors of Korea.

 state funeral(before 2011)
 * Empress Sunjeonghyo (1963)
 * Park Chung-hee (1979)
 * Kim Dae-jung (2009)

 national funeral(before 2011)
 * Kim Koo (1949)
 * Yi Si-yeong (1953)
 * Kim Seong-su (1955)
 * Sin Ik-hui (1956)
 * Chough Pyung-ok (1960)
 * Yi Tjoune (1963)
 * Ham Tae-young (1964)
 * Chang Myon (1966)
 * Chang Taek-sang (1969)
 * Lee Beom-seok (1972)
 * Yuk Young-soo (1974)
 * 16 victims died in of Rangoon Bombing (1983)
 * Yi Bangja (1989)
 * Choi Kyu-hah (2006)
 * Roh Moo-hyun (2009)
 * Kim Dae-jung (2009)

 state funeral(after 2011)
 * Kim Young-sam (2015)
 * Roh Tae-woo (2021)

Thailand 

In Thailand, state funerals are mostly analogous to the royal funerals held for the monarch and members of the Royal Family. Royal ceremonies are also held for the cremation of the supreme patriarch and senior members of the Buddhist clergy.

Vietnam
A state funeral was arranged for the following people on their deathbed on the respective date:

 Huỳnh Thúc Kháng (1947)
 Hồ Chí Minh (1969)
 Nguyễn Lương Bằng (1979)
 Tôn Đức Thắng (1980)
 Lê Duẩn (1986)
 Phạm Hùng (1988)
 Trường Chinh (1988)
 Lê Đức Thọ (1990)
 Nguyễn Hữu Thọ (1996)
 Nguyễn Văn Linh (1998)
 Lê Quang Đạo (1999)
 Phạm Văn Đồng (2000)
 Võ Văn Kiệt (2008)
 Võ Chí Công (2011)
 Võ Nguyên Giáp (2013)
 Phan Văn Khải (2018)
 Trần Đại Quang (2018)
 Đỗ Mười (2018)
 Lê Đức Anh (2019)
 Lê Khả Phiêu (2020)

Europe

Belgium

Belarus

Denmark

 On August 29, 1945, two years after the German occupation force in Denmark had dissolved the Danish army and navy, a state funeral was held for 106 killed members of the Danish resistance at their execution site which was thus inaugurated as the memorial cemetery that would later become Ryvangen Memorial Park. While flags were flying half-mast throughout Copenhagen 106 hearses drove from the Christiansborg Riding Grounds through the city to Ryvangen, where bishop Hans Fuglsang-Damgaard led the funeral with participation from the royal family, the government and representatives of the resistance movement.

Czech Republic

 A state funeral was held for the former President Václav Havel in 2011.
 A funeral with state honors was held for singer Karel Gott in 2019.

Finland

79 people have been awarded the honour of state funeral, among them:
 1921 Juhani Aho, author, the first person honoured with a state funeral in Finland
 1926 Eino Leino, author and poet
 1947 Vera Hjelt, member of Parliament, pioneer of work safety in Finland
 1951 Carl Gustaf Emil Mannerheim, the Marshal of Finland and the 6th President of Finland
 1952 Miina Sillanpää, the first female minister in Finland
 1956 Risto Ryti, the 5th President of Finland
 1957 Jean Sibelius, composer
 1966 Hannes Kolehmainen, the first Finnish Olympic medalist (long-distance running)
 1966 Wäinö Aaltonen, sculptor
 1973 Paavo Nurmi, the most successful Finnish Olympic medalist (long-distance running)
 1976 Armas Taipale, Olympic medalist (discus)
 1980 Rafael Paasio, former Prime Minister and Speaker of the Parliament
 1982 Ville Ritola, Olympic medalist (long-distance running)
 1986 Urho Kekkonen, the 8th President of Finland
 1987 Ella Eronen, actress
 1989 Tapani Niku, Olympic medalist (cross-country skiing)
 1990 Ahti Karjalainen, former Prime Minister
 1992 Väinö Linna, author
 1995 Väinö Valve, general
 2000 Johannes Virolainen, former Prime Minister, Counsellor of State
 2004 Kalevi Sorsa, former Prime Minister
 2004 Adolf Ehrnrooth, General of the Infantry
 2011 Harri Holkeri, former Prime Minister, Counsellor of State
 2017 Mauno Koivisto, the 9th President of Finland

France
The state funerals (obsèques nationales) are awarded by decree of the President of the French Republic to especially eminent Frenchmen and women. It was held for: 

 Victor Hugo (1885)
 Georges Coulon (1912)
 Maurice Barrès (1923)
 Paul Valéry (1945)
 Jacques Leclerc (1947)
 Giraud (1949) 
 Albert Lebrun (1951)
 Léon Blum (1951)
 de Lattre de Tassigny (1952)
 Colette (1954)
 Édouard Herriot (1957) 
 Aimé Césaire (2008)
 Charles Aznavour (2018)

Ireland

Italy

 General Carlo Alberto dalla Chiesa, his wife Emanuela Setti Carraro and agent Domenico Russo, assassinated by the Sicilian mafia on September 3, 1982. In the front row among others are President Sandro Pertini and Prime Minister Giovanni Spadolini.

Lithuania

 October 6, 2018 – Adolfas Ramanauskas-Vanagas – leader of Lithuanian resistance.

 November 22, 2019 – Zygmunt Sierakowski, Konstanty Kalinowski – leaders of the Polish, Lithuanian and Belarusian national revival and the leader of the January Uprising in lands of the former Grand Duchy of Lithuania in the Polish-Lithuanian Commonwealth, and other 18 partipaciants of revival.

Malta
State Funerals have been held for presidents, prime ministers and archbishops.

 The last state funeral held for the President of Malta was that of Censu Tabone in March 2012.
 The last state funeral held for the Prime Minister of Malta was that of Dom Mintoff in August 2012.

Netherlands

 The royal funerals of Prince Claus, Queen Juliana and Prince Bernhard are the only royal funerals that were denoted state funerals; previous royal funerals were considered private affairs.
 The only non-royal Dutchman who is considered to have received a state funeral was Joannes van Heutsz in 1927.

North Macedonia

 The largest state funeral was held in 2004 for President Boris Trajkovski and the funeral was attended by 47 foreign delegations.

 First prime minister of independent Macedonia Nikola Kljusev 
 Singer Toše Proeski.

Poland

 Poland held a state funeral for President of Poland Lech Kaczyński and his wife, Maria Kaczyńska, on April 18, 2010, after he and 95 others perished in a plane crash.

Russia

In Russia, during the time of the Soviet Union (1917–1991), the state funerals of the most senior political and military leaders were staged as massive events with millions of mourners all over the USSR. The ceremonies held after the deaths as Vladimir Lenin, Joseph Stalin, Leonid Brezhnev, Yuri Andropov and Konstantin Chernenko all followed the same basic outline. They took place in Moscow, began with a public lying in state of the deceased in the House of the Unions and ended with an interment at the Red Square. The most notable examples of such state funerals during the Soviet period of Russian history are the ceremonies that were held for Lenin and Stalin, and for the death and funeral of Leonid Brezhnev.

In the second half of the 20th century, whenever a General Secretary of the Communist Party of the Soviet Union died, the event would first be officially acknowledged by Soviet radio and television. After several days of national mourning, the deceased would be given a state funeral and then buried. Soviet state funerals were often attended by foreign heads of state, heads of government, foreign ministers and other dignitaries from abroad. Following the death of General Secretary Leonid Brezhnev in 1982, there were five days of national mourning. Following the death of General Secretary Yuri Andropov in 1984, a four-day period of nationwide mourning was announced.

The state funeral for a deceased General Secretary would be arranged, managed and prepared by a special committee of the Communist Party that would be formed for the occasion. As the funeral committee would normally be chaired by the deceased's successor, the preparations for Soviet state funerals were usually followed with great interest by foreign political scientists trying to gauge power shuffles within the Communist Party. The allocation of responsibilities during the funeral, appointment of pallbearers and positions within the order of precedence observed during the televised funeral ceremonies in Moscow could often be interpreted as a clue for the future position of Politburo members within the Party. When, after Brezhnev's death in 1982, Yuri Andropov was elected chairman of the committee in charge of Brezhnev's funeral, this was seen as a first sign by First World commentators that Andropov might be the most likely candidate for the position of General Secretary.

Prior to interment, the body of the deceased General Secretary would lie in state in the Pillar Hall of the House of the Unions which was decorated by numerous red flags and other communist symbols. The mourners, which usually would be brought in by the thousands, shuffled up a marble staircase beneath chandeliers draped in black gauze. On the stage at the left side of the Pillar Hall, amid a veritable garden of flowers, a full orchestra in black tailcoats would play classical music. The deceased's embalmed body, dressed in a black suit, white shirt and a tie, would be displayed in an open coffin on a catafalque banked with carnations, red roses and tulips, facing the long queue of mourners. A small guard of honour would be in attendance in the background. At the right side of the hall there would be placed seats for guests of honour, with the front row reserved for the dead leader's family.

On the day of the funeral, final ceremonies would be held at the Pillar Hall during which the lid of the coffin would be temporarily closed. The coffin would then be carried out of the House of the Unions and placed on a gun carriage drawn by a military vehicle. A funeral parade would then convey the coffin from the House of the Unions to the Red Square. Two officers led the funeral parade, carrying a large portrait of the deceased, followed by a group of numerous soldiers carrying red floral wreaths. A group of general officers would come next, carrying the late leader's decorations and medals on small red cushions. Behind them, the coffin rested atop a gun carriage. Walking immediately behind were the members of the deceased's family. The Politburo leaders, wearing red armbands, came next and led the last group of official mourners. At Brezhnev's funeral, the escort of official mourners included forty-four persons.

As the coffin reached the middle of the Red Square, it would be removed from the carriage and placed on a red-draped bier facing the Lenin Mausoleum, with its lid removed. After a series of funeral speeches, which were delivered by military and political leaders (typically including the deceased's successor as General Secretary, as well as 'ordinary' workers) from the balcony of the Lenin Mausoleum, the coffin would be carried in a procession around the mausoleum to the Kremlin Wall Necropolis just behind it. There, with the most senior mourners looking on, the coffin would be placed on a red-draped bier and the mourners would pay last respects. The coffin's lid would then be closed for the final time and the body lowered into the ground by two men, with handfuls of earth thrown onto the coffin by the senior mourners. The grave would be filled in immediately afterward, while the mourners were still present to watch. Gun salutes would be fired, sirens sounded around the Kremlin and the Soviet national anthem be played. This marked the end of the interment. The senior mourners would then return to the balcony of the Lenin Mausoleum to review a parade on Red Square while the military band would play quick marches. This concluded the state funeral.

With small deviations, the described protocol was roughly the same for the state funerals of Lenin, Stalin, Brezhnev, Yuri Andropov and Konstantin Chernenko. Lenin and Stalin were placed inside the Lenin Mausoleum while the others were interred in individual graves in the Kremlin Wall Necropolis located behind the mausoleum along the actual Kremlin wall. Stalin's body would lie beside Lenin's in the mausoleum until being moved to the Kremlin Wall Necropolis several years after his death.

In April 2007, Russian Federation's first President Boris Yeltsin was buried in state funeral after church ceremony at Novodevichy Cemetery. He was the first Russian leader and head of state in 113 years to be buried in a church ceremony, after Emperor Alexander III of Russia. His funeral is the template for all state funerals held in Russia today, but with the addition of prayers at the moment of burial by representatives of the Orthodox Church. In November 2010, Russian Federation's Third Prime Minister Viktor Chernomyrdin Was Buried in a State Funeral in a Church Ceremony Novodevichy Cemetery. He Was The Third Prime Minister of the Russian Federation And Was Considered The Second Longest Prime Minister in the Russian Federation For 6 Years. In June 2015, Russian Federation's Fourth Prime Minister Yevgeny Primakov Was Buried in a State Funeral in a Church Ceremony Novodevichy Cemetery. In April 2022, The Founder of the Liberal Democratic Party of Russia Vladimir Zhirinovsky Was Buried in a State Funeral in a Church Ceremony Novodevichy Cemetery, He Was The Founder and the Longest Serving Leader of the Liberal Democratic Party of Russia For 29 Years During The Time.

Slovakia

 A state funeral was held for the former President Michal Kováč in 2016.

Switzerland

 In 1960, the funeral procession of Henri Guisan gathered more than 120,000 people in Lausanne.

United Kingdom

 Queen Elizabeth The Queen Mother
 Winston Churchill in 1965
 Diana, Princess of Wales received a ceremonial funeral in 1997
 Margaret, Baroness Thatcher
 Prince Philip, Duke of Edinburgh
 Queen Elizabeth II in 2022

Former Yugoslavia 

 A massive state funeral was held for the late President Josip Broz Tito on May 8, 1980, in Belgrade, the capital city of the SFR Yugoslavia.

See also
 Abraham Lincoln's burial and exhumation
 "Black Jack"
 Burial at Sea
 Catafalque
 Death and funeral of Corazon Aquino
 Death and funeral of Bhumibol Adulyadej
 Death and state funeral of Elizabeth II
 Death and state funeral of Edward VII
 Death and state funeral of Fidel Castro
 Death and state funeral of George H. W. Bush
 Death and state funeral of George V
 Death and state funeral of George VI
 Death and state funeral of Gerald Ford
 Death and state funeral of Josip Broz Tito
 Death and state funeral of King Hussein
 Death and state funeral of Lech Kaczyński and Maria Kaczyńska
 Death and state funeral of Leonid Brezhnev
 Death and state funeral of Néstor Kirchner
 Death and state funeral of Omar Bongo
 Death and state funeral of Pierre Trudeau
 Death and state funeral of Queen Victoria
 Death and state funeral of Richard Nixon
 Death and state funeral of Ronald Reagan
 Death and state funeral of Nelson Mandela
 Funeral of Diana, Princess of Wales
 Funeral of Pope John Paul II

References
 

+ 
Death-related lists